Descombes is a French language surname that may refer to:

Colette Descombes, French film actress
Émile Descombes (1829–1912), French pianist
Jeanie Descombes (born 1935), American baseball player
Vincent Descombes (born 1943), French philosopher
Vincent Descombes Sevoie (born 1984), French ski jumper

Surnames
French-language surnames

de:Descombes
fr:Descombes
it:Descombes